FC Yedinstvo Dzerzhinsk is a Belarusian football club based in Dzerzhinsk, Minsk Oblast.

History
The team was founded in 1999 as Livadiya Dzerzhinsk and joined Belarusian Second League in 2003. In 2015 they were renamed to Krutogorye Dzerzhinsk. In 2016 the club withdrew from the Second League and was renamed to Livadiya-Yuni Dzerzhinsk (a name previously used by club's reserve team). Since 2016 they play in Minsk Oblast league.

In 2021 the club returned to the Second League with the new name Yedinstvo Dzerzhinsk.

Current squad
As of September 2022

References

External links
Official website 

Association football clubs established in 1999
Football clubs in Belarus
1999 establishments in Belarus